The third season of the talent show competition series Indonesia's Got Talent premiered on RCTI on 8 August 2022, and concluded on 3 October 2022. This show is also the first IGT season to be broadcast on a television station under MNC Media, namely RCTI after the previous two seasons aired on 2 television stations under the auspices of Emtek (SCM), namely Indosiar in 2010 and SCTV in 2014.

Pasheman'90 are the winner of Indonesia's Got Talent for this appearance. It marks the first win by variety talent on this appearance, after the two first appearances that were won by singers. They will be granted IDR 150.000.000,- and 1 Car Unit Hyundai Stargazer.

Host, judges & guest star 
In this season, all host and judges are different from the last 2 seasons.

Host 
 Robby Purba

Judges 
 Ivan Gunawan
 Reza Oktovian
 Rossa
 Denny Sumargo

Guest judges 
 Armand Maulana
 Ariel Noah
 Raline Shah

Guest star 
 2nd Chance
 Ray Prasetya
 Ade Kurniawan
 Fara Shakila 
 Rimar Callista
 Eric Chien
 The Sacred Riana
 Kyuhyun

Sponsor

Main sponsors 
 Mie Sedaap
 Hyundai Stargazer

Television sponsors 
 Tolak Angin
 Sidomuncul Vitamin C 1000 mg
 Vision+
 Motion Pay
 Motion Life
 Trebel Music
 Prime Video
 Spotify
 Aladdin Mall
 Komix Herbal
 Kapal Api
 Viva Cosmetics

YouTube sponsors 
 Tokopedia
 Teh Kotak

Season overview

Golden Buzzer 
The following are the winners of the "Golden Buzzer" chosen by the four judges:

Results 
Below is a list of the overall results of each participant's appearance in this season:

 |  |  |  |  |  | 
  "Golden Buzzer" Audition

Quarter-finals summary 
 Buzzed Out

Quarter-final 1 (September 12)

Quarter-final 2 (September 13)

Semi-finals summary 
 Buzzed Out

Semi-final (September 19) 
Guest Performer: 2nd Chance, Ray Prasetya & Ade Kurniawan

  To respect for this participant, the appearance was not published due to an accident during tapping session.

Finals Summary (September 27 & October 3) 
Guest Performer, Grand Final: Eric Chien and Kyuhyun

 |  |  |

References

External link 

 Indonesia's Got Talent on YouTube

Got Talent
Indonesian reality television series
Television series by Fremantle (company)
2022 Indonesian television series debuts
Indonesian television series based on British television series
RCTI original programming